The 1919 Widnes by-election was held on 30 August 1919.  The by-election was held due to the elevation to the peerage of the incumbent Coalition Conservative MP, William Walker.  It was won by the Labour candidate Arthur Henderson.

Result

References

Widnes
Widnes
1910s in Lancashire
Widnes 1919
Widnes 1919
Widnes 1919